Since 1947, the Joint Typhoon Warning Center (JTWC) has classified all typhoons in the Northwestern Pacific Ocean with wind speeds of at least —the equivalent of a strong Category 4 on the Saffir–Simpson scale, as super typhoons. Since that year, 309 super typhoons have occurred in the basin, the latest being Typhoon Rai in 2021. Only two Pacific typhoon seasons have not included at least 1 super typhoon, which were the 1949 Pacific typhoon season and 1974 Pacific typhoon season. The most typhoons to have reached this intensity in a single season is tied between 1965 and 1997, with 11 becoming super typhoons.

Background

All typhoons that reach an intensity of at least  are referred to by the Joint Typhoon Warning Center as super typhoons. The first typhoon to be identified as a "super typhoon" by the JTWC was Typhoon Rosalind of 1947, a high-end Category 4-equivalent typhoon. From there on, 4 years later, Typhoon Iris in 1951 would become the first Category 5-equivalent typhoon referred to as a super typhoon ever recorded. Tropical cyclones of these violent intensities occur much more often in the Western Pacific, due to the fact it is one of the most active tropical cyclone basins on the planet knowing to the fact it has the warmest sea surface temperatures, which tropical cyclones need to thrive. Sufficient sea surface temperatures and the frequent passing of the Madden–Julian oscillation allow these cyclones to quickly intensify and blossom into violent storms.

Since the first super typhoon was designated, approximately 309 other super typhoons have formed to date. The strongest (and also the most intense tropical cyclone ever recorded) was Typhoon Tip in 1979, the costliest (also the costliest typhoon on record) was Typhoon Hagibis in 2019, the longest-lived was Typhoon Noru in 2017 and Typhoon Rita in 1972, and the deadliest was Typhoon Haiyan in the record-breaking 2013 Pacific typhoon season. Additionally, the earliest-forming super typhoon was Typhoon Karen in January 1948.

Systems
Key
 Discontinuous duration (weakened below super typhoon status before restrengthening)

1947–1959

1960–1969

1970–1979

1980–1989

1990–1999

2000–2009

2010–2019

2020–2029

See also

 Typhoon
 Pacific typhoon season
  Pacific typhoon season

References

Notes

External links
 Japan Meteorological Agency

WPAC SPTY